Anse à Cointe is a quartier of Terre-de-Haut Island, located in Îles des Saintes archipelago in the Caribbean. It is located in the southwestern part of the island. It is a natural anchorage with a hotel le bois joli.

To See
 The beach: A small beautiful beach of white sand and turquoise water.

Populated places in Îles des Saintes
Quartiers of Îles des Saintes